Viktoriya Nikolayevna Yartseva (Викто́рия Никола́евна Я́рцева, 1906–1999) was a Russian linguist and director of the Linguistics Institute of the  Russian Academy of Sciences from 1971 to 1977. She specialized in English and Celtic studies and theoretical linguistics.

Bibliography
 1960, Историческая морфология английского языка (Historical Morphology of the English Language)
 1961, Исторический синтаксис английского языка (Historical Syntax of the English Language)
 1968, Взаимоотношение грамматики и лексики в системе языка (The Relationship of Grammar and Vocabulary in the System of Language)
 1969, Развитие национального литературного английского языка  (The Development of a National Literary English Language)
 1981, Контрастная грамматика (Contrast Grammar)
 1985, История английского литературного языка IX-XV вв (History of English Literature of the 9th to 15th Centuries)

Linguists from Russia
Corresponding Members of the USSR Academy of Sciences
1906 births
1999 deaths
Women linguists
20th-century linguists
Herzen University alumni
Academic staff of Herzen University